Gema Peris Revert (born 20 April 1983 in Valencia) was a Spanish female weightlifter, competing in the 48 kg category and representing Spain at international competitions. 

She participated at the 2004 Summer Olympics in the 48 kg event. She competed at world championships, most recently at the 2007 World Weightlifting Championships.

Major results

Notes

References

External links
 
 
 
 

 http://www.interviu.es/entrevistas/articulos/gema-peris-campeona-de-halterofilia 

1983 births
Living people
Spanish female weightlifters
Weightlifters at the 2004 Summer Olympics
Olympic weightlifters of Spain
People from Valencia
World Weightlifting Championships medalists
Mediterranean Games gold medalists for Spain
Mediterranean Games medalists in weightlifting
Competitors at the 2001 Mediterranean Games
21st-century Spanish women